Sagibovo is a rural locality (a selo) in Kasatkinsky Selsoviet of Arkharinsky District, Amur Oblast, Russia. The population was 59 as of 2018. There is 1 street.

Geography 
Sagibovo is located on the left bank of the Amur River, 94 km southeast of Arkhara (the district's administrative centre) by road. Novopokrovka is the nearest rural locality.

References 

Rural localities in Arkharinsky District